The 2006 United States House of Representatives elections in Connecticut were held on November 7, 2006, to elect the five members of the U.S. House, one from each of the state's congressional districts, to represent Connecticut in the 110th Congress. The elections coincided with a state gubernatorial election and a U.S. Senate election, as well as with Congressional elections in other states.

Four Democrats and one Republicans were elected by these elections; two of the Democratic victories resulted from the defeats of incumbent Republicans. The Representatives elected by these elections served in Congress from January 3, 2007, until January 3, 2009. As of 2020, this is the last election in which a Republican won a congressional district in Connecticut.

Overview

† Includes 5,794 votes received on the line of the Connecticut Working Families Party, which cross-endorsed the Democratic candidate in the Fifth District, Chris Murphy.

District 1

Incumbent Democrat John B. Larson faced Republican challenger Scott MacLean in the election; Larson was re-elected with 74.44 percent of the vote.

Results

District 2

Incumbent Republican Rob Simmons faced Democratic challenger Joe Courtney in the election in a rematch of their 2002 race; Courtney narrowly defeated Simmons by only 83 votes.

Results

District 3

Incumbent Democrat Rosa L. DeLauro faced Republican challenger Joseph Vollano in the election; DeLauro was re-elected with 76 percent of the vote.

Results

District 4

Incumbent Republican Christopher Shays faced Democratic challenger Diane Farrell in the election; Shays was re-elected with 50.96 percent of the vote.

Results

District 5

Incumbent Republican Nancy L. Johnson faced Democratic challenger Chris Murphy in the election; Murphy defeated the incumbent with 56.46 percent of the vote.

Results

WF Murphy also ran on the line of the Connecticut Working Families Party in the election, and received 5,794 of his votes on it. His Democratic and Working Families totals have been aggregated to reach 122,980.

References

Connecticut

2006
2006 Connecticut elections